is the fifth studio album by Japanese idol girl group AKB48. It is the second AKB48 double-album, and was released in Japan on January 22, 2014 by King Records. It debuted at number one in the weekly Oricon Albums Chart, selling over 960,000 copies. On February 6, the album became AKB48's second successive album to sell over one million copies.

Promotion and release 

On 24 November 2013, it was announced that AKB48 would release their 5th studio album, their first in over a year. It was revealed that the album would have 25 songs, including songs such as Manatsu no Sounds Good! and Koisuru Fortune Cookie from their previous singles. The album title, cover and tracks were subsequently reviewed on 21 December 2013. It was also announced that 15 of the tracks were written for this album, and that many of the songs were sung by different units within AKB48. This album is marketed under the catchphrase Our footprints are ahead of us.

The album was released in Japan on January 22, 2014 under King Records in Japan, in several editions: Type A limited, Type A regular, Type B, and Theater. The albums consist of 2 CDs. The Type A limited contains a bonus DVD.  The Theater edition is only sold at the AKB48 theater and only contains the first CD.

The first CD (CD1) includes seven of AKB48's singles that were released in 2012–2013, from "Manatsu no Sounds Good!" to "Koi Suru Fortune Cookie". It includes original songs performed by Team Kenkyusei, as well as songs that were B-sides of singles. The second CD (CD2) has different track lists for Type A and Type B. It contains more B-side singles as well as original songs by AKB48 members. The limited edition has a DVD which shows a short documentary of the group members at a concert.

The seven singles and their B-sides were also sung by and with famous members, currently graduated from AKB48 Tomomi Itano, Mariko Shinoda, Sayaka Akimoto, Tomomi Kasai or Atsuko Maeda. Therefore, these members are not credited in the album.

Track listing 
All songs performed by the AKB48 title track singers except as listed below.

Personnel 

After rain
 Team A : Minami Takahashi, Yui Yokoyama, Mayu Watanabe
 Team K : Yuko Oshima, Rie Kitahara
 Team B : Yuki Kashiwagi, Haruna Kojima, Haruka Shimazaki
 Team 4 : Minami Minegishi
 SKE48 Team S / AKB48 Team K : Jurina Matsui
 SKE48 Team S : Anna Ishida
 NMB48 Team N / AKB48 Team B : Miyuki Watanabe
 NMB48 Team N : Riho Kotani
 HKT48 Team H : Aika Ota, Rino Sashihara
 JKT48 Team J / AKB48 Team B : Aki Takajo
 JKT48 Team J : Haruka Nakagawa
 SNH48 Team SII / AKB48 Team A : Mariya Suzuki
 SNH48 Team SII : Sae Miyazawa
 Graduated Members (not credited) : Tomomi Itano, Mariko Shinoda

Boy Hunt no Houhou Oshiemasu
(Centers: Haruka Shimazaki and Rino Sashihara)
 Team B: Haruka Shimazaki
 SKE48 Team S: Yuria Kizaki
 NMB48 Team: M: Fuuko Yagura
 HKT48 Team H: Rino Sashihara

JJ ni Kitaramono
(Centers: Minami Takahashi and Asuka Kuramochi)
 Team A: Minami Takahashi
 Team K: Rie Kitahara, Asuka Kuramochi
 SKE48 Team KII: Akane Takayanagi
 NMB48 Team M / SKE48 Team KII: Nana Yamada

Shower no Ato Dakara
(Center: Haruna Kojima
 Team B: Yuki Kashiwagi, Haruna Kojima
 SKE48 Team E: Rena Matsui

10 Krone to Pan
(Center: Sayaka Yamamoto)
 Team A: Yui Yokoyama
 Team B: Reina Fujie
 HKT48 Team H / AKB48 Team K: Haruka Kodama
 SKE48 Team E: Nao Furuhata
 NMB48 Team N / AKB48 Team K: Sayaka Yamamoto

Kakushin ga Moterumono
(Center: Mayu Watanabe)
 Team A: Rina Izuta, Anna Iriyama, Karen Iwata, Ryoka Oshima, Rina Kawaei, Ayaka Kikuchi, Haruka Kodama, Marina Kobayashi, Yukari Sasaki, Sumire Sato, Mariya Suzuki, Juri Takahashi, Minami Takahashi, Yūka Tano, Sakiko Matsui, Ayaka Morikawa, Fuuko Yagura, Yui Yokoyama, Mayu Watanabe

Tsuyosa to Yowasa no Aida de
(Center: Sayaka Akimoto)
 Team K : Yuko Oshima, Kana Kobayashi
 Team B : Ayaka Umeda
 SNH48 Team SII: Sae Miyazawa
 Graduated Members (not credited) : Sayaka Akimoto, Megumi Ohori, Tomomi Kasai, Kayo Noro, Yuka Masuda, Natsumi Matsubara
Note = This song commemorated Sayaka Akimoto's graduation from AKB48 in August 2013

Smile Kamikakushi
 Artist: Tentoumu Chu! (てんとうむChu！)
 Team 4: Nana Okada, Mako Kojima, Miki Nishino
 SKE48 Kenkyuusei : Ryoha Kitagawa
 NMB48 Kenkyuusei : Nagisa Shibuya
 HKT48 Kenkyuusei : Meru Tashima, Mio Tomonaga

Ponkotsu Blues
 Team A : Anna Iriyama, Rina Kawaei, Juri Takahashi
 Team K : Maria Abe, Haruka Shimada, Mariya Nagao
 Team B : Rena Kato, Haruka Shimazaki, Miyu Takeuchi, Suzuran Yamauchi
 AKB48 Team B / SKE48 Team KII: Mina Oba
 AKB48 Team B / NMB48 Team N: Miori Ichikawa
 SKE48 Team S / AKB48 Team K : Jurina Matsui
 SKE48 Team S : Yuria Kizaki
 SKE48 Team E : Kanon Kimoto
 HKT48 Team H : Anna Murashige

Ichi Ni No San
 Team K: Yuko Oshima, Mariya Nagao
 Team 4: Minami Minegishi
 SKE48 Team KII: Airi Furukawa
 JKT48 Team J: Aki Takajo

Kyōhansha
 Team K: Maria Abe, Mayumi Uchida, Yuko Oshima, Rie Kitahara, Asuka Kuramochi, Kana Kobayashi, Amina Sato, Haruka Shimada, Shihori Suzuki, Rina Chikano, Chisato Nakata, Mariya Nagao, Rena Nozawa, Rina Hirata, Nana Fujita, Nao Furuhata, Ami Maeda, Miho Miyazaki, Tomu Muto
 SKE48 Team S / AKB48 Team K: Jurina Matsui

Dōki'
 Team B: Haruka Shimazaki

Kanashiki Kinkyori Renai
Team B: Haruka Ishida, Miori Ichikawa, Misaki Iwasa, Ayaka Umeda, Mina Oba, Miyuu Omori, Shizuka Ōya, Yuki Kashiwagi, Haruka Katayama, Rena Kato, Natsuki Kojima, Haruna Kojima, Haruka Shimazaki, Aki Takajo, Miyu Takeuchi, Miku Tanabe, Mariko Nakamura, Wakana Natori, Misato Nonaka, Reina Fujie, Suzuran Yamauchi, Miyuki Watanabe

Chireba Ii no ni...
Kenkyuusei: Manami Ichikawa, Rio Ōkawa, Nana Owada, Haruka Komiyama, Kiara Sato, Makiho Tatsuya, Seina Fukuoka, Mion Mukaichi, Ami Yumoto

Release history

Charts

Certifications

Release history

References
 Album references

 Other references

External links 

 King Records
 Type-A Limited Edition profile
 Type-A Regular Edition profile
 Type-B profile
 Theatre Edition profile

2014 albums
AKB48 albums
King Records (Japan) albums
Albums produced by Yasushi Akimoto
Japanese-language albums